Upper Wolfjaw Mountain is a mountain located in Essex County, New York. 
Landscape artist Alexander Helwig Wyant (1836–1892) named the mountain, in combination with neighboring Lower Wolfjaw Mountain, c. 1870 for their appearance in profile. 
The mountain is part of the Great Range of the Adirondack Mountains.
Upper Wolfjaw Mtn. is flanked to the southwest by Armstrong Mountain, and to the northeast by Lower Wolfjaw Mtn.

Upper Wolfjaw Mountain stands within the watershed of the East Branch of the Ausable River, which drains into Lake Champlain, thence into Canada's Richelieu River, the Saint Lawrence River, and into the Gulf of Saint Lawrence.
The east and southeast sides of Upper Wolfjaw Mtn. drain into the East Branch of the Ausable River. 
The west side of Upper Wolfjaw drains into Ore Body Brook, thence into Johns Brook and the East Branch.
The north side of Upper Wolfjaw drains into Wolfjaw Brook, thence into Johns Brook.

Upper Wolfjaw Mountain is within the High Peaks Wilderness Area of New York's Adirondack Park.

See also 
 List of mountains in New York
 Northeast 111 4,000-footers
 Adirondack High Peaks
 Adirondack Forty-Sixers

Notes

External links 
  Peakbagger.com: Upper Wolfjaw Mountain
  Summitpost.org: Upper Wolf Jaw Mountain
 

Mountains of Essex County, New York
Adirondack High Peaks
Mountains of New York (state)